Peter Campbell Scarlett CB, DL (27 November 1804 – 15 July 1881), styled The Honourable from 1830, was a British diplomat.

Background
Scarlett was the youngest child of James Scarlett, 1st Baron Abinger and his wife Louise Henrietta Campbell, daughter of Peter Campbell. His older brother was Robert Scarlett, 2nd Baron Abinger and his older sister Mary Campbell, 1st Baroness Stratheden. He was educated at Eton College.

Career
Scarlett served successively as attaché at the British embassies in Constantinople from 1825, then in Paris from 1828 and finally Rio de Janeiro from 1834. He was sent to Florence as secretary of legation in 1844, later acting as chargé d'affaires. In 1854, he was awarded a Commander of the Order of the Bath and was appointed Envoy Extraordinary and Minister Plenipotentiary to Brazil in the end of 1855. Despite his stay abroad, Scarlett received a commission as Deputy Lieutenant for Surrey in the following year.

After three years in Brazil, he was transferred in December 1858 as Envoy Extraordinary and Minister Plenipotentiary to the Grand Duke of Tuscany until 1859, when following the occupation by Kingdom of Sardinia, the grand duchy was abolished. Scarlett became Envoy Extraordinary and Minister Plenipotentiary to the King of Greece in 1862, a post he held for the next two years. In 1864, he was nominated Envoy Extraordinary and Minister Plenipotentiary to the Emperor of Mexico and retired in 1867.

Family
He married Frances Sophia Mostyn, second daughter of Edmund Lomax, on 22 May 1843 and had by her two sons and a daughter. She died in 1849 and Scarlett remarried Louisa Anne, daughter of James Murray, Lord Cringletie, and widow of Edward Jeannin, on 27 December 1873. This second marriage was childless. Scarlett died at London in 1881 and was survived by his wife who died on 19 March 1900.

Works
South America and the Pacific; Comprising a Journey Across the Pampas and the Andes, from Buenos Ayres to Valparaiso, Lima, and Panama; with Remarks upon the Isthmus. To which are Annexed Plans and Statements for Establishing Steam Navigation on the Pacific; (1838)
A Memoir of the Right Honorable James, First Lord Abinger, Chief Baron of Her Majesty's Court of Exchequer; (1877)

References

1804 births
1881 deaths
Ambassadors of the United Kingdom to Brazil
Companions of the Order of the Bath
Deputy Lieutenants of Surrey
People educated at Eton College
Younger sons of barons
Ambassadors of the United Kingdom to Greece
Ambassadors of the United Kingdom to Mexico